The 1920 Gotha state election was held on 30 May 1920 to elect the 19 members of the Landtag of Gotha.

Results

References 

Gotha
Elections in Thuringia
May 1920 events